Pterorytis is a genus of sea snails, marine gastropod mollusks in the family Muricidae, the murex snails or rock snails.

Species
Species within the genus Pterorytis include:

 Pterorytis hamatus (Hinds, 1844)

References

Ocenebrinae
Monotypic gastropod genera